"A Happy Place" is a song performed by the Georgian-born, British singer Katie Melua and the second single from her 4th studio album The House. It was released on 12 July 2010, featuring a remix of the track by Sparks.

Music video
The video itself was filmed in a paternoster lift in Haus des Rundfunks, Berlin and directed by Mike Batt. The constant movement of the lift and one’s inability to stop it represent the constant flow of life. The hat Melua wears in the video was made by a milliner called Piers Atkinson.

In an interview with The Sun, Melua explained with regards to the video: "It was about finding peace within yourself no matter how much life is flowing in the right or wrong direction."

Track listing
Digital download

CD single</>

Release history

References

2010 singles
Katie Melua songs
Songs written by Katie Melua
Songs written by Guy Chambers
2010 songs
Dramatico singles